The 1999 Minnesota Golden Gophers football team represented the University of Minnesota in the 1999 NCAA Division I-A football season. In their third year under head coach Glen Mason, the Golden Gophers compiled an 8–4 record, outscored their opponents by a combined total of 368 to 196, tied for fourth place in the Big Ten Conference, and were ranked #17 and #18 in the final Coaches and AP polls.

Tyrone Carter was named an All-American by the Walter Camp Football Foundation, Associated Press, The Sporting News, Sportsline.com, American Football Coaches Association, College Football News and Football Writers Association of America.  Carter, center Ben Hamilton, running back Thomas Hamner and defensive end Karon Riley were named All-Big Ten first team.  Defensive tackle John Schlecht and corner back Willie Middlebrooks were named All-Big Ten second team.  Carter was awarded the Jim Thorpe Award, given to the best defensive back in the country.  Offensive lineman Akeem Akinwale, linebacker Luke Braaten, Free Safety Jack Brewer, offensive lineman Derek Burns, defensive end Mike Cernoch, punter Preston Gruening, Linebacker Justin Hall, wide receiver Ron Johnson, defensive end Astein Osei, full back Brad Prigge, long snapper Derek Rackley, defensive tackle Dave Sykora and tight end Zach Vevea were named Academic All-Big Ten.

Total attendance for the season was 318,086, which averaged out to 45,441 per game.  The season high for attendance was against rival Wisconsin.

Schedule

Rankings

Roster

References

Minnesota
Minnesota Golden Gophers football seasons
Minnesota Golden Gophers football